Alopecosa trabalis is a species of wolf spiders in the genus Alopecosa found in "Europe to Central Asia".

This species was described in 1757 in Chapter 5 of the book Svenska Spindlar by Carl Alexander Clerck.

See also 
 List of Lycosidae species

References 

trabalis
Spiders of Asia
Spiders of Europe
Spiders described in 1757
Taxa named by Carl Alexander Clerck